Elías Jácome Guerrero (2 November 1945 – 26 July 1999) was the first Ecuadorian football referee to participate in a FIFA World Cup. He supervised the Spain versus South Korea match (3-1) during the 1990 FIFA World Cup held in Italy.

References
 Profile
 Article by FEF

1945 births
1999 deaths
Ecuadorian football referees
FIFA World Cup referees
1990 FIFA World Cup referees
Copa América referees
Place of birth missing